Li Xiang (born 11 February 1976) is a Chinese actress, host and singer.

Biography
Li was born in Yueyang, Hunan in February 1976. She is a graduate of Communication University of China, where she majored in acting and broadcasting. Li received her EMBA degree from Cheung Kong Graduate School of Business and Beijing University of International Business and Economics.

In 2004, Li founded a company in Beijing.

Personal life
Li was twice married. Originally wed to entrepreneur Li Houlin, the couple divorced in 2006.

Li remarried in 2009, Wang Yuelun, her second husband, they have a daughter, named Angela Wang Shiling. Li and Wang divorced in July 2021.

Works

TV Series

Film

Studio album

Books
 Happy Wind (1999)
 The Story of the Sweet Honey (2010)

References

1976 births
People from Yueyang
Communication University of China alumni
Beijing University of International Business and Economics alumni
Living people